Hold It Right There! is a live album by saxophonist/vocalist Eddie "Cleanhed" Vinson which was recorded at Sandy's Jazz Revival in 1978 and released on the Muse label in 1984.

Reception

The AllMusic review by Scott Yanow stated "After years of neglect, Eddie "Cleanhead" Vinson was finally receiving long overdue recognition at the time of this live session -- one of six albums recorded during a week at Sandy's Jazz Revival ... While Vinson has fine blues vocals  ... it is his boppish alto solos ... that make this set recommended to blues and bop fans alike".

Track listing
 "Cherry Red" (Joe Turner) – 3:45
 "Cherokee" (Ray Noble) – 7:27
 "Hold It Right There" (Eddie Vinson) – 7:10
 "Now's the Time" (Charlie Parker) – 6:53
 "Take the "A" Train" (Billy Strayhorn) – 14:01

Personnel
Eddie "Cleanhead" Vinson – alto saxophone, vocals
Ray Bryant – piano
George Duvivier – bass
Alan Dawson – drums
Arnett Cobb, Buddy Tate - tenor saxophone (tracks 3 & 5)

References

Muse Records live albums
Eddie Vinson live albums
1984 live albums
Albums produced by Bob Porter (record producer)